Tischeria ambigua is a moth of the family Tischeriidae. It is known from California, United States.

The larvae feed on Ceanothus oliganthus. They mine the leaves of their host plant.

References

Tischeriidae
Moths described in 1915